

Date
In the Netherlands, dates are written using the little-endian pattern "day–month–year" as is usual elsewhere in Europe and many other countries. Either dashes or slashes are used as separators. Times are written using 24-hour notation.

 
 
 

The names and abbreviations of months and days are as follows:

Names of months and days are not capitalised in Dutch.

Time

In technical and scientific texts the use of the abbreviations h, min and s is common – for example, 17 h 03 min 16 s. The use of the 12-hour clock in numeric writing is not standard practice, not even in informal writing, and writing e.g., "" for 13:30 would be regarded as odd. The actual Dutch terms for a.m. and p.m. are respectively v.m. and n.m. ( and ), but these are very old-fashioned and even more rare than the use of a.m. and p.m. in written language.

In spoken language, most often time is expressed in the 12-hour clock. However, "a.m." and "p.m." are never used. Instead, an apposition is added, for instance 21:00 is said as "" (9 o'clock in the evening). Half hours are relative to the next hour – for example, 5:30 is said as "". Quarter hours are expressed relative to the nearest whole hour – for example, 6:15, "" (quarter past six) and 6:45, "" (quarter to seven). Minutes are usually rounded off to the nearest five minutes and are expressed relative to the closest half-hour. For instance 05:35 is "" (literally "5 past half to 6") and 05:20 is "" (literally "10 to half to 6").

When the 24-hour clock is used in spoken language, which is not quite common, usually the written form is pronounced with the hours as a number, the word "" (hour) and the minutes as a number. For example, 17:21 might be pronounced as "" (seventeen hours twenty-one). Hours over 12 are not usually combined with phrasings using "half", "quarter", "to", or "past".

See also 
 Date format by country

References

Time in the Netherlands
Netherlands